Piclear is a system that removes scratches from that film as it moves through a projector, an early form of what is called wet-gate printing. It works by daubing the film with a liquid that fills in scratches as it enters the projection gate. The liquid evaporates quickly after projection.

The system was invented by Richard "Dick" Sassenberg, traffic manager at RKO Television. In 1957, he formed a company based in Mamaroneck, New York to market his invention. It was used by many television stations.

In 1978, the company was awarded an Academy Award for Technical Achievement "for originating and developing an attachment to motion picture projectors to improve screen image quality".

References

Companies based in Westchester County, New York
Manufacturing companies of the United States
Academy Award for Technical Achievement winners